This was the first of four editions of the tournament in the 2021 ATP Challenger Tour calendar.

Mats Moraing and Oscar Otte won the title after defeating Riccardo Bonadio and Denis Yevseyev 6–1, 6–4 in the final.

Seeds

Draw

References

External links
 Main draw

Open de Oeiras - Doubles